Ontario Reign may refer to:

 Ontario Reign (AHL), current professional ice hockey team from Ontario, California that play in the American Hockey League as of the 2015–16 season
 Ontario Reign (ECHL), defunct professional ice hockey team from Ontario, California that played in the ECHL from 2008 to 2015